The Glen Lyon is a 100,000 tonne 880 ft long floating production, storage and offloading vessel (FPSO). The ship was built in South Korea and is anchored to the seabed at the Schiehallion and Loyal oil fields in the North Sea in waters 1,300ft deep.

It is said by BP to be the largest "harsh water" FPSO ship in the world.

References

External links

Ships of BP
Floating production storage and offloading vessels
2010s ships